Tubaria furfuracea, commonly known as the scurfy twiglet, is a common species of agaric fungus in the family Tubariaceae. It was first described by Christiaan Hendrik Persoon in 1801 as a species of Agaricus. French mycologist Claude-Casimir Gillet transferred it to the genus Tubaria in 1876.

Description 
The mushroom cap is 1–4 cm wide, orange-brown, convex to flat and depressed, with small marginal patches of veil which disappear with age or rain; its odor is mild. The gills are brown and adnate to slightly decurrent. The stalk is 1–5 cm tall and 2–4 mm wide. The spores are pale reddish-brown, elliptical, and smooth.

The species is considered inedible.

Similar species 
Similar species include T. confragosa, Galerina marginata, and Psilocybe cyanescens.

References

External links

Tubariaceae
Fungi described in 1801
Fungi of Europe
Fungi of North America
Inedible fungi
Taxa named by Christiaan Hendrik Persoon